The South East Asia Graduate School of Theology (SEAGST) is a Protestant graduate school of theology, established in 1966 and operated by the Association for Theological Education in South East Asia (ATESEA) in cooperation with and on behalf of member schools of ATESEA. The headquarters is located in the offices of ATESEA in Manila, Philippines.

Objectives and aims

Academics

SEAGST conducts programs of advanced and postgraduate theological studies at the masters and doctoral levels and grants the degree of Master of Theology (MTheol) and Doctor of Theology (DTheol) to students who would study at one of the approved campuses of SEAGST in the region.

The program makes available to graduates of approved theological schools in South East Asia the combined academic resources of the participating accredited schools so that suitable students may have the opportunity of continuing their studies within South East Asia. Selected students from outside the region may also be admitted to the program upon presentation of proper credentials and application form.

Aims

The specific aims of SEAGST are:

 To assist in the intellectual and spiritual development of Asian theologians so that their Christian ministry will be enrich and be more effective.
 To contribute to the emergence of contextual and Asia-oriented theology by providing the facilities, and opportunities for research into, and reflection upon, the Christian faith as it relates to the living faiths, cultures and traditions of Asia, and to contemporary Asian society and its problems.
 To further the training of competent teachers for the theology faculties of the region and of leaders for Christian ministry in church and society.
To promote opportunities for the interchange of the graduate students and faculty members between the different participating institutions with a view to enhancing both a regional consciousness and Christian fellowship across the barriers of race, cultures and nations.

SEAGST claims to be ecumenical in doctrine and in its relationships to the Churches and participating schools. The faculty and students represent a board spectrum of Christian belief and denominational affiliation.

Organisation

Governance
SEAGST is governed by a Board of Governors which is responsible for all financial and budgetary matters of SEAGST; takes action on requests from accredited schools to participate in program; upon the recommendation of Senate, authorizes conferment of degrees on successful candidates; appoints the Dean, and appoints the faculty of SEAGST on the recommendation of the Senate.

The current Chairperson of the Board of Governors is Dr. Thu En Yu from Malaysia.

Regional Campuses
As the SEAGST functions as a consortium of participating schools accredited by ATESEA and as a validator of the postgraduate degrees issued, the faculty and campuses of SEAGST is spread out over the whole South East Asian region. There are a total of 27 schools in seven geographical areas; each one headed by an Area Dean; within SEAGST. To qualify as a participating school, an institution normally must have at least three teachers with a Ph.D. or Th.D. or equivalent and sufficient library holdings or research at master and doctoral level.

The current geographical areas and their participating schools are:

Hong Kong Area
Area Dean: Dr. Ying Fuk-Tsang
Divinity School of Chung Chi College, Chinese University of Hong Kong website
Shatin, New Territories
Lutheran Theological Seminary website
Shatin, New Territories

Eastern Indonesia Area
Area Dean: Dr. Zakaria J. Ngelow
Faculty of Theology, Indonesian Christian University of Tomohon
Tomohon, North Sulawesi
Theology Department, Indonesian Christian University of Maluku
Ambon, Maluku
Theological Seminary of Eastern Indonesia Makassar (STT INTIM Makassar) website
Makassar, South Sulawesi
Faculty of Theology, Artha Wacana Christian University
Kupang, East Nusa Tenggara
Toraja Christian College (STAKN Toraja) website
Rantepao, South Sulawesi

Western Indonesia Area
Area Dean: Dr. E. Gerrit Singgih
HKBP Theological Seminary (STT HKBP)
Pematang Siantar, North Sumatra
Jakarta Theological Seminary (STT Jakarta) website
Jakarta, DKI Jakarta
Faculty of Theology, Duta Wacana Christian University website
Yogyakarta, Yogyakarta
Cipanas Theological Seminary (STT Cipanas) website
Cipanas, West Java

Malaysia-Singapore Area
Area Dean: Dr. Ezra Kok
Trinity Theological College website
Upper Bukit Timah Road, Singapore
McGilvary College of Divinity, Payap University website
Chiang Mai, Chiang Mai Province, Thailand
Malaysia Theological Seminary website
Seremban, Negeri Sembilan, Malaysia
Sabah Theological Seminary website
Kota Kinabalu, Sabah, Malaysia

Myanmar Area
Area Dean: Dr. Anna May Say Pa
Myanmar Institute of Theology website
Insein, Yangon Division
Myanmar Institute of Christian Theology
Insein, Yangon Division
Kayin Baptist Seminary
Insein, Yangon Division
Holy Cross Theological College
Yangon, Yangon Division
Kachin Theological College
Nawng Nang, Myitkyina, Kachin State

Philippines Area
 Area Dean: The Very Rev Thomas Maddela
 Adventist International Institute of Advanced Studies website
Silang, Cavite
 Central Philippine University College of Theology 
Iloilo City, Iloilo
 Silliman University Divinity School
Dumaguete, Negros Oriental
 St. Andrew's Theological Seminary
Quezon City, Metro Manila
 Union Theological Seminary
Dasmariñas, Cavite

Taiwan Area
''Area Dean: Dr. Huang Po-ho
Tainan Theological College and Seminary website
Tainan
Taiwan Theological College and Seminary website
Taipei
Yu-Shan Theological College and Seminary website
Hualien, Hualien County

Accreditation

As an institution under the auspices of ATESEA, SEAGST is accredited by the same organisation.

See also

 Association for Theological Education in South East Asia
 Asia Graduate School of Theology

References

External links
 South East Asia Graduate School of Theology

Seminaries and theological colleges in the Philippines
Universities and colleges in Metro Manila
Education in Valenzuela, Metro Manila
Educational institutions established in 1966
College and university associations and consortia in the Philippines